Heliodinidae, commonly known as sun moths, is a family of small moths with slender bodies and narrow wings. Members of this family are found in most parts of the world. Heliodinid moths are brightly coloured day-flying moths. The base of the haustellum is bare. The scales on the head are compact and appear like a shield. Many Heliodinidae raise their hindlegs when resting but this is not a taxonomic feature and several genera like Epicroesa and Lamprolophus do not show this posture. Many Heliodinidae have the inner and outer spurs of the metatibia subequal. The larval host plants of the majority of species are in the Aizoaceae, Chenopodiaceae, Phytolaccaceae, Portulacaceae and Nyctaginaceae, all in the Order Caryophyllales. A few feed on Onagraceae, Araliaceae and Piperaceae. The pupae have long stiff hairs on their back sides.

Genera
The family includes the following genera:

Former genera
Aenicteria
Coracistis
Lamachaera
Percnarcha
Placoptila
Zapyrastra has been listed in the Heliodinidae but is now part of Momphidae.

References

 
Yponomeutoidea